Matignon Accords or Matignon Agreements may refer to:

Matignon Agreements (1936), an agreement between the French government, employers and labour guaranteeing trade union membership and negotiating rights, a 40-hour working week and paid workers' holidays
Matignon Agreements (1988), an agreement for increased New Caledonian territorial autonomy between the French government, Kanak independence activists and French settlers

See also 
Matignon (disambiguation)